A staple food, food staple, or simply a staple, is a food that is eaten often and in such quantities that it constitutes a dominant portion of a standard diet for a given person or group of people, supplying a large fraction of energy needs and generally forming a significant proportion of the intake of other nutrients as well.  A staple food of a specific society may be eaten as often as every day or every meal, and most people live on a diet based on just a small number of food staples. Specific staples vary from place to place, but typically are inexpensive or readily available foods that supply one or more of the macronutrients and micronutrients needed for survival and health: carbohydrates, proteins, fats, minerals, and vitamins. Typical examples include tubers and roots, grains, legumes, and seeds. Among them, cereals, legumes, tubers, and roots account for about 90% of the world's food calories intake.

Early agricultural civilizations valued the foods that they established as staples because, in addition to providing necessary nutrition, they generally are suitable for storage over long periods of time without decay. Such nonperishable foods are the only possible staples during seasons of shortage, such as dry seasons or cold temperate winters, against which times harvests have been stored. During seasons of plenty, wider choices of foods may be available.

Staple foods are derived either from vegetables or animal products, and common staples include cereals (such as rice, wheat, maize, millet, barley, oats, rye, spelt, emmer, triticale and sorghum), starchy tubers or root vegetables (such as potatoes, cassava, sweet potatoes, yams, turnips, rutabagas or taro), meat, fish, eggs, milk, and cheese, and dried legumes such as lentils and other beans. Other staple foods include sago (derived from the pith of the sago palm tree), and fruits such as breadfruit and plantains. Staple foods may also include (depending on the region) olive oil, coconut oil, and sugar (e.g. from plantains).

Demographics

The dominant staple foods in different parts of the world are a function of weather patterns, local terrain, farming constraints, acquired tastes and ecosystems. For example, the main energy source staples in the average African diet are cereals (46 percent), roots and tubers (20 percent) and animal products (7 percent). In Western Europe the main staples in the average diet are animal products (33 percent), cereals (26 percent), and roots and tubers (4 percent).

Most of the human population lives on a diet based on one or more of the following staples: cereals (rice, wheat, maize (corn), millet, and sorghum), roots and tubers (potatoes, cassava, yams and taro), and animal products such as meat, milk, eggs, cheese and fish. Regional staples include the plants rye, soybeans, barley, oats, and teff.

Just 15 plant crops provide 90 percent of the world's food energy intake (exclusive of meat), with rice, maize, and wheat comprising 2/3 of human food consumption. These three are the staples of about 80 percent of the world population, and rice feeds almost half of humanity.

Roots and tubers, meanwhile, are important staples for over one billion people in the developing world, accounting for roughly 40 percent of the food eaten by half the population of sub-Saharan Africa.  Roots and tubers are high in carbohydrates, calcium, and vitamin C, but low in protein. Cassava root, for example, is a major food staple in the developing world, a basic food source for around 500 million people.

With economic development and free trade, many countries have shifted away from low-nutrient-density staple foods to higher-nutrient-density staples, as well as towards greater meat consumption. Despite this trend, there is growing recognition of the importance of traditional staple crops in nutrition. Agriculture constantly seeks to identify better plant strains with superior nutrition, disease resistance, and higher yields.

Some foods like quinoa—a pseudocereal grain that originally came from the Andes—were also staples centuries ago.  Oca tubers, ulluku tubers and grain amaranth are other foods claimed to be historical Andean staples.  Pemmican made from dried meat and fat was a staple of the Plains Indians of North America. In 2010, the global consumption of "speciality grains", such as quinoa, was very small compared to other staples, such as rice, wheat, and maize. These grains, once popular, are being reevaluated and reintroduced to certain markets.

Production 
Most staple food is currently produced using modern, conventional farming practices. However, the production of staple food using organic farming methods is growing.

Processing
Rice is most commonly cooked and eaten as separate entire grains, but most other staple cereals are milled into a flour or meal that can be used to make bread, noodles, pasta, porridge and mushes like mealie pap. Root vegetables can be mashed and used to make porridge-like dishes such as poi and fufu. Pulses (such as chickpeas, from which gram flour is made) and starchy root vegetables (such as canna rhizomes) can also be made into flour.

Nutrition

Consumed in isolation, staple foods do not provide the full range of essential nutrients. The nutrient-deficiency disease pellagra is associated with a diet consisting primarily of maize, while the disease beriberi is associated with a diet of refined white rice. Scurvy can result from a lack of vitamin C, also known as ascorbic acid. One author indicated that the nutritional value of some staple foods are negatively affected by higher levels of carbon dioxide, as occurs in climate change.

Comparison of 10 staple foods
The following table shows the nutrient content of 10 major staple vegetable foods in raw form on a dry weight basis to account for their different water contents. Raw grains are not edible and cannot be digested, so must be cooked, sprouted, or otherwise prepared for human consumption. In sprouted and cooked form, the relative nutritional and anti-nutritional contents of each of these grains is different from that of the raw form of these grains, as shown. Potatoes also must be cooked, but should not be sprouted. Note that the highlighted values show the highest nutrient density among these 10 staples. Other foods, consumed in smaller quantities, may have nutrient densities different from these values.

Images

See also

Cash crop
Subsistence agriculture
Famine food
Vavilov centers

References

External links